Norton Township is a township in Jefferson County, Kansas, USA.  As of the 2000 census, its population was 955.

Geography
Norton Township covers an area of 39.06 square miles (101.17 square kilometers); of this, 0.12 square miles (0.3 square kilometers) or 0.3 percent is water. The streams of Howard Creek and Hulls Branch run through this township.

Cities and towns
 Nortonville

Adjacent townships
 Center Township, Atchison County (north)
 Mount Pleasant Township, Atchison County (northeast)
 Easton Township, Leavenworth County (east)
 Jefferson Township (southeast)
 Delaware Township (west)
 Benton Township, Atchison County (northwest)

Cemeteries
The township contains three cemeteries: Corpus Christi, Nortonville, and Saint Josephs.

Major highways
 U.S. Route 59
 U.S. Route 159
 K-4

References
 U.S. Board on Geographic Names (GNIS)
 United States Census Bureau cartographic boundary files

External links
 US-Counties.com
 City-Data.com

Townships in Jefferson County, Kansas
Townships in Kansas